The Turbomeca Arrius is one of a family of turboshaft engines for helicopter use, first produced in 1981. As of 2012, some 2,700 units had been sold. Power ranges between 357 kW (479 shp) and 530 kW (716 shp) for different versions. 
Following Turbomeca tradition, the Arrius was named after a Pyrenean peak (pic d'Arrius), located in the Ossau Valley near Pau.

Variants
Arrius 1A
Arrius 1A1
Arrius 1M
Arrius 2B1
Arrius 2B1A
Arrius 2B2
Arrius 2F
Arrius 2K1
Arrius 2K2
Arrius 2G1
Arrius 2R

Applications

Turboshafts
 Eurocopter AS355 N Ecureuil 2 (2 x Arrius 1A)
 Eurocopter AS355 NP Ecureuil 2 (2 x Arrius 1A1)
 Eurocopter AS555 Fennec (2 x Arrius 1M)
 Eurocopter EC135 T1 (2 x Arrius 2B1/2B1A)
 Eurocopter EC135 T2 (2 x Arrius 2B2)
 Eurocopter EC635 T1 (2 x Arrius 2B1/2B1A)
 Eurocopter EC635 T2 (2 x Arrius  2B2)
 Eurocopter EC120B Colibri (1 x Arrius 2F)
 Agusta A109 Power (2 x Arrius 2K1/2K2)
 Kamov Ka-226T (2 x Arrius 2G1)
 Bell 505 Jet Ranger X (1 x Arrius 2R)

Gas generator
 SNCASO Farfadet

Specifications (Arrius 1A)

See also

References

Notes

Bibliography

External links

 Turbomeca website - Arrius

1980s turboshaft engines
Turbomeca Arrius
Arrius